In probability theory and information theory, adjusted mutual information, a variation of mutual information may be used for comparing clusterings. It corrects the effect of agreement solely due to chance between clusterings, similar to the way the adjusted rand index corrects the Rand index. It is closely related to variation of information: when a similar adjustment is made to the VI index, it becomes equivalent to the AMI. The adjusted measure however is no longer metrical.

Mutual information of two partitions
It is presumed here that the partitions are so-called hard clusters; the partitions are pairwise disjoint:

for all , and complete:

That is,

Suppose an object is picked at random from S; the probability that the object falls into cluster  is:

The entropy associated with the partitioning U is:

H(U) is non-negative and takes the value 0 only when there is no uncertainty determining an object's cluster membership, i.e., when there is only one cluster. Similarly, the entropy of the clustering V can be calculated as:

where . The mutual information (MI) between two partitions:

where  denotes the probability that a point belongs to both the cluster  in U and cluster  in V:

MI is a non-negative quantity upper bounded by the entropies H(U) and H(V). It quantifies the information shared by the two clusterings and thus can be employed as a clustering similarity measure.

Adjustment for chance
Like the Rand index, the baseline value of mutual information between two random clusterings does not take on a constant value, and tends to be larger when the two partitions have a larger number of clusters (with a fixed number of set elements N).
By adopting a hypergeometric model of randomness, it can be shown that the expected mutual information between two random clusterings is:

where 
denotes .

and

The adjusted measure for the mutual information may then be defined to be:
.

The AMI takes a value of 1 when the two partitions are identical and 0 when the MI between two partitions equals the value expected due to chance alone.

References

External links
  Matlab code for computing the adjusted mutual information
 R code for fast and parallel calculation of adjusted mutual information
 Python code for computing the adjusted mutual information

Information theory
Clustering criteria